Clérico is an Italian surname. Notable people with the surname include:

Emmanuel Clérico (born 1969), French racing driver
Francesco Clerico (c. 1755—1838), Italian ballet dancer, choreographer and composer. Was active since 1776 in Teatro di Sant'Agostino (Genoa), La Scala (Milan), Teatro San Samuele and La Fenice (Venice).
Jacki Clérico (1929–2013), French businessman
 Nicole Clerico (born 1983), Italian tennis player

Clerico may also refer to: 
 Piana Clerico, a clothing company in Biella, Piedmont, Italy
 25905 Clerico, an asteroid
 Clericó, a Latin American drink similar to sangria

See also
Clerici

French-language surnames